During the 2000–01 season, Middlesbrough participated in the FA Premier League.

Season summary
Some early season relegation worries saw Middlesbrough chairman Steve Gibson respond by installing former England boss Terry Venables as joint manager alongside Bryan Robson in December. This experiment with joint management paid off as Middlesbrough finished 14th to avoid the drop by a comfortable margin.

Robson and Venables both departed after the season was over, and in came Manchester United assistant Steve McClaren to manage the Teesside club.

Team kit and sponsors
Middlesbrough were again sponsored by BT Cellnet for the 2000–01 season.

The team's strip was produced by Errea. The home shirt consisted of a red shirt with white hoop, red shorts and red socks with white trim. The away strip consisted of a black shirt with red and white stripes in the middle, plain black shorts and black socks.

Final league table

Results summary

Results by round

Results
Middlesbrough's score comes first

Legend

FA Premier League

FA Cup

League Cup

First-team squad
Squad at end of season

Left the club during season

Reserve squad

Transfers

In

Out

Transfers in:  £18,200,000
Transfers out:  £6,200,000
Total spending:  £12,000,000

Player statistics

Goalscorers
Goalscoring statistics for 2000-01.

References

Middlesbrough F.C. seasons
Middlesbrough